The Austrian autobahns are  controlled-access highways in Austria. They are officially called Bundesstraßen A (Bundesautobahnen) under the authority of the Federal Government according to the Austrian Federal Road Act (Bundesstraßengesetz), not to be confused with the former Bundesstraßen highways maintained by the Austrian states since 2002.

Network map

History 
Ideas to build up a limited-access road network with grade separated interchanges had been developed already in the 1920s, including a "Nibelungen" highway along the Donau (Danube) river from Passau to Wien (Vienna) and further on towards Budapest. Those plans however had never been carried out due to the lasting economic crisis that hit the country after the dissolution of Austria-Hungary in 1918, exacerbated by the Great Depression.

The first autobahn on Austrian territory was the West Autobahn from Salzburg to Vienna. Building started immediately after the Austrian Anschluss in 1938 the annexation of Austria on order of Adolf Hitler as extension of the German Reichsautobahn-Strecke 26 from München (Munich) (the present-day Bundesautobahn 8). However, only  including the branch-off of the planned Tauern Autobahn had been finished on 13 September 1941. Construction works discontinued the next year due to World War II. After the war delaying resistance by the Soviet occupation forces as well as claims raised by West Germany to the former Reichsautobahn assets obstructed the resumption until 1954. 

Construction started in the US-occupied zone of Salzburg and Upper Austria, partly relying on the pre-war planning, and were extended after the country gained full sovereignty by the 1955 Austrian State Treaty. The first section of the West Autobahn up to Mondsee was opened in 1958, by 1967 the route between Salzburg and Vienna was completed. From 1959 onwards the Süd Autobahn was built to reach the southern state capitals of Graz and Klagenfurt from Vienna. The construction of the Tauern Autobahn was not resumed until 1969. The Inn Valley Autobahn in the western state of Tyrol was built from 1968 onwards, up to today it is not directly connected to the main Austrian autobahn network, as via motorway drivers have to use the German autobahns BAB 8 and 93 along the Deutsches Eck link.

Autobahn system 
Austria currently has 18 autobahns, since 1982 built and maintained by the self-financed ASFiNAG stock company in Vienna, which is wholly owned by the Republic of Austria and earns revenue from road user charges and tolls. Each route bears a number as well as an official name with local reference, which, however, is not displayed on road signs. Unusually for European countries, interchanges (between motorways called Knoten, "knots") are numbered by distance in kilometres starting from where the route begins. That arrangement is also used in the Czech Republic, Slovakia, Hungary, Spain and most Canadian provinces (and in most American states, albeit in miles).

The system is going to be expanded; one autobahn is currently under construction, and one more is planned. The transit traffic across the main chain of the Alps, especially by trucks, has led to a considerable environmental load to the fragile Alpine ecosystem. Several action groups urge the transfer of freight transport from road to rail. In 1991, Austria signed the Alpine Convention on the protection of the natural environment.

Traffic laws and enforcement 
They may only be used by powered vehicles that are designed to achieve at least . While on the motorway voluntary stops, U-turns and backward driving are prohibited.

Schnellstraßen 

Schnellstraßen (officially Bundesstraßen S) are federal limited-access roads very similar to Autobahnen; the chief difference is that they are more cheaply built with fewer tunnels, mostly just following the given topography. Depending on the road extension, they are either signposted as Autobahn or Autostraße according to Austrian traffic regulations. The speed limit on Schnellstraßen is 100 km/h, however on some it is 130 km/h indicated by a sign.

As they fit better with the mountainous topography of Austria, Schnellstraßen often serve as an autobahn substitute. For example, the main link between the Austria's westernmost state of Vorarlberg and adjacent Tyrol is entirely provided by the S16 Arlberg Schnellstraße, including the Arlberg Road Tunnel completed in 1979.

Tolls 

Since 1997, the use of all Autobahnen and Schnellstraßen requires the purchase of a vignette (toll sticker) for passenger cars up to 3.5 tonnes or a GO-Box (electronic toll system) for trucks and buses. The toll fee (Maut) has to be paid to legally access the Austrian Autobahns at any time except the Autobahns listed below. On routes which are more costly to maintain, mostly Alpine routes with tunnels—sections of the Pyhrn Autobahn, the Tauern Autobahn (Tauern Tunnel) and the Karawanken Autobahn (Karawanken Tunnel), as well as the Brenner Autobahn—a toll is collected at time of use via toll plazas and therefore drivers do not need to have a vignette to use these Autobahn sections.

Vignettes (coll. Pickerl) are available in varying lengths of validity (10 days, two months, or a year). , a vignette valid for a year costs €85.70 for cars and €34.10 for motorcycles. To prove to have paid this fee, the toll stickers have to be put onto the inside of the front windscreen. Once removed, they no longer are valid, so each car on Austrian Autobahns needs its own toll sticker.

Since 2004 trucks must carry the GO-Box, a little white box which counts the length of the Autobahn used by way of electrical control points, queried by overhead DSRC microwave radio transceivers at different locations. Overhead 3-D infrared laser scanners are used to detect and photograph trucks travelling without it.

A fine of €110 must be paid if a vehicle is on the motorway without a GO-Box or a vignette, or a fine of €240 if a vignette is not affixed onto the windscreen or in one of the approved places or the vehicle is on the motorway with a vignette that has expired or been tampered with. If the driver refuses to pay the fine, then the fine will increase to between €300 and €3,000.

See also
Transport in Austria
List of controlled-access highway systems
Evolution of motorway construction in European nations

References

External links 
  Autobahnen und Schnellstraßen finanzierungs AG (ASFINAG), Austria's autobahn agency

 
Lists of buildings and structures in Austria
Austria
Austria transport-related lists